Better Angels may refer to:

 "Better Angels" (The Walking Dead), an episode of the AMC television series The Walking Dead
 "Better Angels" (Agent Carter), an episode of the second season of Agent Carter
 "Better Angels" (FlashForward), an episode of the American television series FlashForward
 "Better Angels" (NCIS), an episode of the American police procedural drama NCIS
 "Better Angels" (Supergirl), an episode of the first season of Supergirl
 Better Angels (novel), a science fiction novel by Howard V. Hendrix
 Braver Angels (formerly known as Better Angels), an initiative of the Institute for American Values to depolarize US politics

See also
 The Better Angels, a 1979 thriller novel by Charles McCarry
 The Better Angels (film), a 2014 biographical film
 The Better Angels of Our Nature, a 2011 book by Steven Pinker
 Abraham Lincoln's first inaugural address, wherein the phrase better angels is used